Summer holiday may refer to:

 Summer vacation, a holiday in the summertime between school years

Film
 Summer Holiday (1948 film), an American musical starring Mickey Rooney
 Summer Holiday (1963 film), a British musical starring Cliff Richard, and later stage adaptations
 Summer Holiday (2000 film) (Ha yat dik mo mo cha), a Hong Kong romance film starring Sammi Cheng
 "Summer Holiday" (The Young Ones), an episode of the TV series The Young Ones
 "Summer Holiday", an episode of the TV series On the Yorkshire Buses

Music
 Summer Holiday (album), a soundtrack album from the 1963 film, by Cliff Richard and The Shadows
 Summer Holiday, album by BZN
 Summer Holiday (EP), a 2021 EP by South Korean girl group Dreamcatcher
 Summer Holiday (song), the title song from the 1963 film

See also
 Holiday (disambiguation)
 "Holiday Rap"